This is a list of wars involving the Republic of Ireland and its predecessor states, since the Irish War of Independence. Since the 1930s, the state has had a policy of neutrality and has only been involved in conflicts as part of United Nations peacekeeping missions. 

There have been many wars on the island of Ireland throughout history. Before independence, all of Ireland was part of the United Kingdom and Irish soldiers fought in many foreign wars as part of the British military. Irish soldiers also fought in conflicts as part of other armies.

List

See also
 List of conflicts in Ireland
 List of wars involving the United Kingdom of Great Britain and Ireland

References

 
Ireland
Wars